Polypedates zed is a species of frog in the family Rhacophoridae. It is found in Nepal and possibly India. Its natural habitats are subtropical or tropical moist lowland forests, swamps, and freshwater marshes.

References

Zed
Taxonomy articles created by Polbot
Amphibians described in 1986